The 2007–2008 session was a meeting of the California State Legislature.

Dates of sessions
Convene: December 4, 2006
Adjourn: August 31, 2008

Major events

Vacancies and special elections
March 16, 2007: Assemblyman Richard Alarcón (D-39) resigns to take a seat on the Los Angeles City Council
May 15, 2007: Felipe Fuentes (D-Sylmar) wins the special election for the 39th Assembly District seat to replace Alarcón and is sworn in on May 25
September 4, 2007: Assemblywoman Laura Richardson (D-55) resigns to take a seat in the United States House of Representatives, replacing Congresswoman Juanita Millender-McDonald, who died on April 22, 2007
February 5, 2008: Warren T. Furutani (D-Gardena) wins the special election for the 55th Assembly District seat to replace Richardson and is sworn in on February 7
June 3, 2008: The recall election against Senator Jeff Denham (R-12) fails, with over 75% of the voters deciding to keep Denham in office

Leadership changes
February 7, 2008: Senator Darrell Steinberg (D-6) is named to replace Senator Don Perata (D-9) as president pro tempore of the Senate, as Perata is termed out at the end of the term
April 15, 2008: Senator Dave Cogdill (R-14) replaces Senator Dick Ackerman (R-33) as Senate Republican Leader, as Ackerman is termed out at the end of the term
May 13, 2008: Assemblywoman Karen Bass (D-47) replaces Assemblyman Fabian Núñez (D-46) as Speaker of the Assembly, as Núñez is termed out at the end of the term

Members
Skip to Assembly, below

Senate

  Democrats: 25
  Republicans: 15

Officers
President Pro Tem: Don Perata (D-9)
Majority Leader: Gloria Romero (D-24)
Minority Leader: Dick Ackerman (R-33) to April 15, 2008; Dave Cogdill (R-14) from April 15, 2008

Full list of members, 2007-2008

Assembly

Officers
Speaker Karen Bass (D-47) from May 13, 2008
Fabian Núñez (D-46) to May 13, 2008
Speaker pro Tempore Sally J. Lieber (D-22)
Assistant Speaker Pro Tempore Lori Saldaña (D-76) from May 16, 2008
Laura Richardson (D-55) to September 4, 2007
Majority Floor Leader Alberto Torrico (D-20) from May 13, 2008
Karen Bass (D-47) to May 13, 2008
Minority Floor Leader Michael Villines (R-29)
Chief Clerk E. Dotson Wilson
Sergeant at Arms Ronald Pane
Note: The Chief Clerk and the Sergeant at Arms are not Members of the Legislature

Full List of Members, 2007-2008

*Felipe Fuentes won the May 15, 2007 special election for the 39th Assembly District seat to replace Richard Alarcón, who resigned on March 16, 2007, to take a seat on the Los Angeles City Council.

**Warren T. Furutani won the February 5, 2008 special election for the 55th Assembly District seat to replace Laura Richardson, who resigned on September 4, 2007, to take a seat in the United States House of Representatives, replacing Juanita Millender-McDonald who died on April 22, 2007.

2006 elections

The last Assembly elections occurred on November 7, 2006. The Democratic Party retained their majority, with no loss or gain of seats for any party.

See also
 List of California state legislatures

References

2007-2008
2007 in California
2008 in California
California
California